Lana Barić (born 11 December 1979) is a Croatian actress. She appeared in more than twenty films since 2001.

In 2017, Lana Barić has signed the Declaration on the Common Language of the Croats, Serbs, Bosniaks and Montenegrins.

Selected filmography

References

External links 

1979 births
Living people
Actors from Split, Croatia
Croatian film actresses
Golden Arena winners
Signatories of the Declaration on the Common Language